Artyom Leonidovich Danilenko (born 22 March 1990) is a Russian former professional football player.

External links
 

1990 births
People from Balakhninsky District
Living people
Russian footballers
FC Nizhny Novgorod (2007) players
FC Volga Nizhny Novgorod players
Russian Premier League players
Association football forwards
FC Nizhny Novgorod (2015) players
FC Khimik Dzerzhinsk players
FC Sportakademklub Moscow players
Sportspeople from Nizhny Novgorod Oblast